The 2009 Intercontinental Rally Challenge was the fourth season of the Intercontinental Rally Challenge. The season consists of twelve rounds and began on January 21, with the 77° Rallye Automobile Monte-Carlo. The season ended on November 21, at the inaugural RAC Rally of Scotland. With four wins, Kris Meeke won the championship ahead of Jan Kopecký and Freddy Loix.

Calendar
The calendar had been increased from 10 events in 2008, to twelve in 2009. Out went the Istanbul Rally, the Rally de Portugal, the Rallye International du Valais and the China Rally. To be replaced by the Rallye Automobile Monte-Carlo, the Rally Internacional de Curitiba, the Safari Rally, the Rallye Açores, Rally Japan and the Rally of Scotland. Rally Japan was later cancelled, mainly because the major manufacturers looked unlikely to travel to Japan.

Selected entries

Results

Standings

Drivers
 Only the best seven scores from each driver count towards the championship.

Manufacturers
 Only the best seven scores from each manufacturer count towards the championship.

References

IRC 2009 at ewrc-results.com

External links
 The official website of the Intercontinental Rally Challenge

Intercontinental Rally Challenge seasons